Black Pastels is the debut album by cellist Hank Roberts which was recorded in 1987 and released on the JMT label.

Reception
The AllMusic review by Scott Yanow said it was "Recommended to open-eared listeners who have a strong sense of humor".

Track listing
All compositions by Hank Roberts
 "Black Pastels" - 7:54   
 "Jamil" - 4:58   
 "Mountain Speaks" - 2:17   
 "Rain Village" - 2:00   
 "Choqueno" - 7:54   
 "This Quietness" - 4:15   
 "Granpappy's Barn Dance Death Dance" - 10:22   
 "Scarecrow Shakedown" - 3:21   
 "Lucky's Lament" - 6:01

Personnel
Hank Roberts - cello, voices, classical 12-string guitar, jazz-a-phone fiddle
Tim Berne - alto saxophone
Ray Anderson, Robin Eubanks - trombone
Dave Taylor - bass trombone
Bill Frisell - guitar, acoustic 12-string guitar, banjo
Joey Baron - drums, percussion 
Mark Dresser - double bass (track 9)

References 

1988 albums
Hank Roberts albums
JMT Records albums
Winter & Winter Records albums